The Giesen–Hauser House (also known as the Gregory & Nancy Ward Residence) is a historic house located at 827 Mound Street in Saint Paul, Minnesota.

Description and history 
The three-story, Queen Anne style, sandstone and brick house was designed by Albert Zschoke and built in 1891. As addressed in its NRHP designation, “the design of the residence exemplifies many of the popular elements contributing to the diversity and picturesque qualities of Victorian building.”

It was listed on the National Register of Historic Places on May 19, 1983.

References 

Houses completed in 1891
Houses in Saint Paul, Minnesota
Houses on the National Register of Historic Places in Minnesota
National Register of Historic Places in Saint Paul, Minnesota
Queen Anne architecture in Minnesota